Noé Perron (born 18 November 2000) is a French ice dancer. With his skating partner, Lou Terreaux, he is the 2022 Bavarian Open and Bosphorus Cup bronze medalist. The two represented France at the 2020 World Junior Championships.

Career

Early years 
Noé Perron began learning to skate in 2005. As a young ice dancer, he skated with Clémence Vitti and Clara Ekici. He teamed up with Lou Terreaux by 2016. Early in their career, the two were coached by Eric Le Mercier.

Terreaux/Perron debuted on the ISU Junior Grand Prix (JGP) series in August-September 2018, placing eighth in Linz, Austria. They trained in Villard-de-Lans, coached by Karine Arribert-Narce, Violetta Zakhlyupana, and Vladimir Pastukhov.

Terreaux/Perron retained the same coaches for the 2019–20 season. They had two JGP assignments, placing sixth in France and eighth in Russia. Silver medalists at the French Junior Championships, they were named in France's team to the 2020 World Junior Championships in Tallinn. The two finished 15th overall in Estonia after placing 15th in both segments.

Senior career 
Terreaux/Perron made their senior international debut in October 2021, at the Trophée Métropole Nice Côte d'Azur. In January 2022, they won bronze at the Bavarian Open in Oberstdorf, Germany.

In December 2022, they were awarded bronze at the Bosphorus Cup in Istanbul, Turkey. They are coached by Olivier Schoenfelder, Marien de la Asuncion, and Muriel Zazoui in Lyon, France.

Programs

With Terreaux

Competitive highlights 
CS: Challenger Series; JGP: Junior Grand Prix

With Terreaux

With Ekici

With Vitti

References

External links 
 
 
 

2000 births
French male ice dancers
Living people
Sportspeople from Belfort